Hein van Garderen (born 7 March 1969) is a South African épée, foil and sabre fencer. He competed in three events at the 1992 Summer Olympics.

References

External links
 

1969 births
Living people
South African male épée fencers
Olympic fencers of South Africa
Fencers at the 1992 Summer Olympics
South African male foil fencers
South African male sabre fencers